The 2019–20 Legia Warsaw season is the club's 103rd season of existence, and their 83rd in the top flight of Polish football.

Players

Current squad

Out on loan

Transfers

In

Out

Competitions

Friendlies

Ekstraklasa

Results by round

Regular season

League table

Championship Round

Polish Cup

Europa League

First qualifying round

Legia Warsaw won 4–0 on aggregate.

Second qualifying round

Legia Warsaw won 1–0 on aggregate.

Third qualifying round

Legia Warsaw won 2–0 on aggregate.

Play-off round

Legia Warsaw lost 0–1 on aggregate.

Statistics

Notes

References

External links

Legia Warsaw seasons
Legia Warsaw
Legia Warsaw